Microwave thermotherapy is a type of treatment in which body tissue is heated by microwave irradiation to damage and kill cancer cells or to make cancer cells more sensitive to the effects of radiation and certain anticancer drugs.

See also
 Transurethral microwave thermotherapy
 Hyperthermia therapy

References
 Microwave therapy entry in the public domain NCI Dictionary of Cancer Terms

Microwave technology
Radiation therapy